The Kolam Ayer Mosque is a mosque in Kampung Nong Chik, Johor Bahru, Johor, Malaysia. The mosque is located on Jalan Kolam Air.

See also
 Islam in Malaysia

References

Buildings and structures in Johor Bahru
Mosques in Johor